Until 1 January 2007 Hinnerup municipality was a municipality (Danish, kommune) in Aarhus County on the Jutland peninsula in central Denmark.  The municipality covered an area of 76 km², and had a total population of 12.048 (2005).  Its last mayor was Niels Berg, a member of the Venstre (Liberal Party) political party. The main town and site of its municipal council was the town of Hinnerup.

Hinnerup municipality ceased to exist due to Kommunalreformen ("The Municipality Reform" of 2007).  It was merged with Hadsten, Hammel, and Hvorslev municipalities, as well as the southern part of Langå municipality to form the new Favrskov municipality.  This created a municipality with an area of 487 km² and a total population of ca. 41,596 (2005).  The new municipality belongs to Region Midtjylland ("Mid-Jutland Region").

External links 
 Favrskov municipality's website

References 
 Municipal statistics: NetBorger Kommunefakta, delivered from KMD aka Kommunedata (Municipal Data)
 Municipal mergers and neighbors: Eniro new municipalities map

Former municipalities of Denmark